is a Japanese non-fiction book by novelist Minae Mizumura. First published in 2008, the book argues that the Japanese language and Japanese literature are in decline, in part due to the influence of English as a global language, and in part due to failures in Japanese education. Mizumura's criticisms of contemporary Japanese literature and recommendation to eliminate compulsory English language education generated significant public controversy in Japan.

The Fall of Language in the Age of English became a bestseller in Japan and received the Hideo Kobayashi Prize. An expanded English version, translated and revised by Mari Yoshihara and Juliet Winters Carpenter, was published in 2015, and extended parts of the original work's argument to make the work more relevant to readers outside Japan. The English version received mixed reviews in English-language press, with several reviewers criticizing its assumptions about Japanese uniqueness.

Summary 

After relating some of her experiences with other writers working in non-English languages during her time in residence at the International Writing Program, Mizumura describes a theory that puts the various languages of the world into three categories. Following Benedict Anderson and his idea of imagined community, Mizumura links the idea of a written "national" language to the idea of nation-building by suggesting that a national literature solidifies spoken "local" language into a common written language, thereby allowing people who read that "national" language to imagine themselves as part of a nation. "Universal" languages, the third category, are languages such as Latin or English that have been used widely for intellectual activities such as law, trade, and scholarship across national boundaries. In practical terms, Mizumura defines a "universal" language as the most common second language of people around the world.

Mizumura then relates a history of the Japanese language and its transition into a "national" language, including the development of multiple writing systems, the forced opening of previously un-colonized Japan to the world, and the construction of an intellectual culture around translating foreign works into Japanese. Building on an analysis of Natsume Sōseki's work, Mizumura argues that this unique transition has disconnected modern readers of Japanese from their literary history at two points: first, as the written language's connections to classical Chinese were lost, isolating later readers from earlier writing; and second, as postwar efforts at written language reform devalued and diminished the written language to the point where current readers cannot even understand, much less write novels comparable to, works of literature written during Sōseki's time.

The book concludes with a proposal for changing how Japan's schools treat Japanese and English. For Mizumura, the asymmetry of influence between the "universal" language of English and national languages is made stronger than ever by the dominance of English on the internet. At the same time, she points out that Japanese education policy has not provided a counterweight to the dominant power of English, requiring years of compulsory English courses for students while requiring almost no engagement with classic Japanese texts. Instead of trying to give everyone an education in English that they may not want, Mizumura proposes, Japan should expand the teaching of Japanese literature in public schools, and focus English education resources only on those few students who show the aptitude and desire to become capable in both languages.

Background 

Mizumura's family moved from Japan to the United States when she was 12.  Rather than focusing on improving her English language skills, she instead focused on improving her Japanese language skills by reading volumes from a collection of works of classic Japanese literature that her family had received as a gift from a relative. She remained in the United States until she completed a graduate degree in French literature at Yale University, then returned to Japan in 1990 to pursue a career as a novelist.

According to Mizumura, her engagement with Japanese literature was driven by homesickness and a feeling of being out of place in the US. But upon her return to Japan she was surprised by what she viewed as the low quality of contemporary Japanese literature, and she gradually developed the arguments and proposals in The Fall of Language in the Age of English both as a chronicle of her personal history with languages and as a criticism of literature and literacy in contemporary Japan. The Fall of Language in the Age of English was her first non-fiction book.

Publication and reception

Initial publication 

In 2008, Chikuma Shobō published the first edition of the book in Japanese under the title Nihongo ga Horobiru Toki: Eigo no Seiki no Naka de (lit. When the Japanese Language Falls: In the Age of English). The book became what literary scholar and translator Jay Rubin has called "one of the most widely discussed non-fiction titles ever published". Popular blogger and Hatena board member Mochio Umeda wrote a positive review on his Hatena blog suggesting that every Japanese person should read Mizumura's book. For writer Akio Nakamata, Umeda's support drove the popularity of book on bookselling sites such as Amazon, despite the book's contents reflecting "linguistic nationalism" and Mizumura's "pessimism, ignorance, and arrogance". Writing in 2009, media critic Chiki Ogiue looked back on Umeda's Twitter response, in which he dismissed the negative reaction to his original blog post as "too much stupid stuff", as an example of how flame wars escalate on the internet.

Acknowledging the online reaction as "an Internet sensation in which legions of bloggers gave their opinions", literary scholar Haruo Shirane also observed that Mizumura was attacked from both the left and the right, with critics on the political left emphasizing the similarities between prewar imperialism and Mizumura's ideas about national language, and critics on the political right emphasizing her apparent concession that Japanese language and literature were in decline. Novelist and poet Natsuki Ikezawa, reviewing the book for Mainichi Shimbun, largely avoided stoking controversy, instead praising the clarity of Mizumura's theory, particularly the theoretical connection between the maintenance of the Japanese language and the possibility of creating Japanese literature. Novelist Akiko Ohtake, writing for the Books Kinokuniya website, identified a concern about the state of modern literature as the driving force of Mizumura's book, but questioned the basis for Mizumura's concern, while also finding Mizumura's arguments from patriotism to be unpersuasive.

The Japanese version of The Fall of Language in the Age of English was a bestseller, selling over 65,000 copies. A discussion between Mizumura and Umeda about English, Japanese, literature, and the internet was published in the January 2009 issue of Shinchō magazine. Later that year, The Fall of Language in the Age of English received the 8th Hideo Kobayashi Prize. The prize, which is sponsored by Shinchō publisher Shinchosha and includes prize money in the amount of ¥1,000,000, is awarded annually to a non-fiction work that displays flexible and original thinking. The Japanese version of the book was subsequently reviewed in the New York Times, with reviewer Emily Parker acknowledging the "simplification" of the Japanese language, particularly with the introduction of internet and mobile phone technologies, but also citing evidence that Japanese people as a whole were reading and writing more than ever before.

English translation 

Mizumura delivered early versions of the book's arguments as academic talks to English-speaking audiences at Yale University, Columbia University, and the 2007 annual meeting of the Association for Japanese Literary Studies. According to Mizumura, she originally intended to remove some of the parts of the Japanese original that might have seemed "overly patriotic" to English speakers, and originally worked with University of Hawaiʻi at Mānoa professor Mari Yoshihara, who translated the Japanese edition and also found the US publisher, Columbia University Press. After Yoshihara produced her translation, Mizumura worked with translator Juliet Winters Carpenter to revise and expand the book for English-speaking audiences. The English version was published by Columbia University Press in 2015 under the title The Fall of Language in the Age of English.

Despite Mizumura's efforts to tone down the apparent patriotism of the Japanese original, reviewers of the English edition compared passages of the book to the claims of "wartime ideologues", claimed that the book was "rife with examples of Nihonjinron (theories of Japanese uniqueness)", and suggested that several parts of the book "reinforce the perception that her call for a defence of Japanese language is entangled with ethnic nationalism". Haruo Shirane additionally noted that the part of Japan's literary history that Mizumura admired and defended in the book coincided with Japan's strongest imperialist and colonialist ambitions, including the period during which Japan imposed the Japanese language on Korea and Taiwan.

Reviewers generally agreed with the book's points about the growing and homogenizing influence of English. In an essay for the Financial Times, Simon Kuper concurred with Mizumura that the increasing emphasis on perfect English, particularly in social media and journalism, was "bad news for non-English languages and literatures". Reviewing the book for the Claremont Review of Books, Marc Heberle agreed with Mizumura that English "is the virtually inescapable medium for those desiring to be taken seriously". But reviewers questioned whether the effects of this homogenizing influence were unique to the Japanese context or entirely negative. As Graham Oliver wrote in a review for The Rumpus, the homogenizing effects of English are a "tragedy felt by readerships across the globe". In The Journal of Asian Studies, Selma Sonntag suggested that Mizumura's proposals about elite English education could be informed by historical debates about elite English education and privilege in India. And while largely agreeing with Mizumura about the "flattening and homogenizing effect" of English, literary scholar Stephen Snyder observed that it enabled Japanese writers such as Haruki Murakami to reach a global audience, which then opened doors worldwide for translations of other works of Japanese literature.

References 

2008 non-fiction books
Books about literature
Japanese non-fiction books